Corkagh Park (from corcach, meaning "marsh") is a park situated in Clondalkin in South Dublin, between the N7 and the Old Nangor Road. The River Camac flows through it and within the grounds of the park there are fishing ponds. A caravan park can be found near the parks N7 entrance. The area, once Corkagh Demesne, contained two large houses, and historically also featured mills.

History 
Formerly, the park was known as Corkagh Demesne, on which two large houses stood, and gunpowder mills were run.

When Lewis Chaigneau bought Corkagh in the 1720s he leased a portion of the estate to Nicholas Grueber for the establishment of gunpowder mills. Grueber ran the mills from 1716 to 1733.  The gunpowder mills on Corkagh Estate, active during the 18th and 19th centuries, were regarded as a nationally important centre for the production of gunpowder and provided employment for many local people. Most of the mill buildings were situated in Kilmatead which adjoins Corkagh.

Explosions were common occurrences at gunpowder mills. However, an explosion in 1787 was so big that it was felt as far away as the city and caused damage to buildings around Clondalkin. The mill building itself was completely destroyed. The Arabin family ran the mills in the 1790s.

Corkagh Park was purchased in 1983 by Dublin County Council, and since 1994 South Dublin County Council have managed the park.

Notable residents and visitors of the Corkagh estate included Arthur Wolfe and Elizabeth Bowen.

Recreation 

Ireland's only purpose-built cycle track is located in Corkagh Park. Criterium cycle races are commonly held here during the summer.

The park includes other recreational facilities including a playground, pet farm, and sports pitches.

Environment 
There are over 390 different species inhabiting Corkagh Park, with 20,000 trees planted in the early 1980s and 1990s. Tree specimens include Fraxinus (ash), Quercus (oak), Tilia (lime), Juglans (walnut), Cedrus (cedar), Fagus (beech), Aesculus (Chestnut) and Sequoiadendron. The Common frog and Pipistrelle Bat, protected species under the 1976 Wildlife Act, are both found in the park. Kestrels and other birds have been found nesting in trees. The hawfinch is an occasional winter visitor. The great spotted woodpecker, Ireland's newest breeding species, has been seen here recently.

References

Parks in Dublin (city)